The women's 20 kilometres walk event at the 2007 Asian Athletics Championships was held in Amman, Jordan on July 25.

Results

References
Final results

2007 Asian Athletics Championships
Racewalking at the Asian Athletics Championships
2007 in women's athletics